Society of Students Against Poverty (Imam Ali's Popular Students Relief Society), (Jameeat-e-Imam Ali) is the first nonpartisan, student NGO in Iran founded in 1999 and has its first official office in Sharif University in 2000.
The major activities are social problems, especially about children. Since 2010 the NGO is a member of United Nations Economic and Social Council.

The founder of the Imam Ali's Popular Students Relief Society Sharmin Meymandi Nejad, is the initiator of Intelligent Charity.

Intelligent Charity Organization means an organization in which all the members are like a body, they evaluate the circumstances especially in social problems and present solutions in every case. Solutions are given by the university students that have expert and knowledge in that case. The solutions are based on students’ theory and domain researches and make program and schedules.

Activity fields of this community mostly deal with children related topics, such as orphan children, runaway children, Juvenile delinquency, child labor, sick children and also with poor families (mostly because of their children)

Committees
Health Committee: both prevention and cure for the families under control.
Social Committee: dealing with family pathology like child harassment, selling children, family addiction...
Education Committee: educating and cheering children, and helping the best of them in their supplemental education.
Culture and art Committee: improving the cultural level of the children and families
Employment Committee: Finding job opportunities and making employment for family members

Major organization’s programs

Rahyaft-e-Darooni 
Sharmin is the professor of organization's tutorial classes called “Rahyaft”. Syllabuses of this class are:

1.     Theology
Bases and origins of all of world's live religions.
2.     Linguistics
The origin of different languages, comparison of eastern and western languages, and the effect of the language on the way we think.
3.     Symbols
Is it possible if we stop word-thinking and begin to concentrate our attention to the symbols and concepts?
4.     Personal and collective unconscious
5.     Healing methods
6.     NLP (Neural Linguistic Planning) 
7.     Cosmology
Origin and initiation of the world in accordance to religions and science.
8.     Meditation, TM and Relaxation
9.     Yoga
10.  Sum up and conclusion

In most of these syllabuses, the presented material include contents that are presented for the first time and most of the theoretical subjects are novel ones. That is why these classes have met great popularity and active participation from university students.

Koochegardan-e-Ashegh
Koochegardan is the most famous activity of the organization. This national-religious ceremony, runs every Ramadan.
In this program, students gather needful materials for the poor families from their universities. And on the 21st night of Ramadan, Laylat al-Qadr (Night of Power, or Decree) and the night of the martyrdom of Imam Ali, they give all the gathered materials to the needy people.

Koochegardan started in 1999 in Tehran and continued to this date. The latest Koochegardan took place in October 2006, in Tehran, Kermanshah, Zanjan, Zabol,...
The 2006 program gave away about 5000 packages of materials. 
Each package contains objects like:
Rice, sugar, fish tuna, chicken or meat, tea, lentil, cheese, date, honey, macaroni...

Iran Supreme Leader, Ayatollah Khamenei at the speech of Eid ul-Fitr named this activity and praised their effort .

The 1st Cancer seminar (about children)
The seminar took place in Sharif University, Shahid Beheshti University and The Dialogue Between Civilizations Center, for 5 days in 1999.

Children of love festival (Jashnvare Farzandan-e-Mehr)
The festival consisted of three sections: short films, movie dramas and theater.
All of the performances dealt with social and humanitarian problems. There were also some groups of  behzisti children performing alongside professional ones.
Sharif University, Amirkabir University of Technology, Allame Tabatabaie university, Jahad Daneshgahi and Alzahra University, were the hosts of the festival in 1999.

Birth of Jesus Christ ceremony (Jashn-e-Milad-e-Masih)

In January 2000, and 2001, the organization celebrated the birth of Jesus Christ with attendance of Christian members and with the purpose of respecting the love of Jesus Christ toward human being and also to emphasis on organization's view toward all religions’ objectives, which is to love people and make a better society.

On December 22, 2006, the ceremony took place again. Father Kishishian and Sharmin Meymandi Nejad gave speeches on Christianity and Islam and the religious part in helping people.

Iran 1130
Iran 1130, is a plan to make the candidates of Iranian presidential election, build a village in their election campaigns instead of heavily spending on paper ads and the like.
Some of the 2005 candidates showed their interest toward this plan but the complete version of it is yet to come.

Teflan-e-Moslem
According to the 2005 conference about the condition of Iranian children, held by the first big brother society, a seminar took place in Tehran Juvenile Correction & Rehabilitation Center in the holy month of Muharram in the year 2007, with the aim to free some of the children who were there because of money.

Other activities
Praying ceremonies - Street Children (The seminar in Alzahra University in March 1999) - Little teachers of love (Yadvare-e-Moalleman-e-Koochak-e-Eshgh) – Interpretation of Quran – Nurse day ceremony (in Ali Asghar Hospital) – Toy festival (one week program in Koohsangi park in Mashhad, with the assistance of Ferdowsi University of Mashad in September 2001) – Celebration of Love (Jashn-e-Mehr, in October 2001 in University of Tabriz) – Helping the people of Bam, following the earthquake - Protest against the condition of the Iraqi children during the war in April 2003, at UN center in Tehran.

External links
Website
Website of Koochegardan-e-Ashegh
Teflan-e-Moslem Weblog
An article in 40 cheragh Magazine
Koochegardan on Mizanews.com 
Protest Against war's effect on Iraqi children before UN center in Tehran in Iran newspaper
Iran 1130 plan in Iran newspaper
Gathering toy for children in Iran newspaper
Koochegardan in Iran newspaper
Koochegardan in Iran newspaper
Koochegardan in Iran newspaper
Koochegardan in Iran newspaper
ISNA Photo Gallery about Koochegardan-part1
ISNA Photo Gallery about Koochegardan-part2
ISNA Photo Gallery about Koochegardan-part3

Child-related organisations in Iran
Student organisations based in Iran